Vishvashantha Weerakoon (born 21 July 1987) is a Sri Lankan cricketer. He made his List A debut for Sri Lanka Army Sports Club in the 2007–08 Premier Limited Overs Tournament on 25 November 2007. He made his first-class debut for Sri Lanka Army Sports Club in the 2008–09 Premier Trophy on 30 January 2009. Seven years after his last first-class match for Sri Lanka Army Sports Club, Weerakoon played a single first-class match in Tier B of the 2016–17 Premier League Tournament on 2 December 2016 for Kalutara Physical Culture Centre.

References

External links
 

1987 births
Living people
Sri Lankan cricketers
Kalutara Physical Culture Centre cricketers
Sri Lanka Army Sports Club cricketers
People from Panadura